Agelasta yunnana is a species of beetle in the family Cerambycidae. It was described by Chiang in 1963. It is known from China.

References

yunnana
Beetles described in 1963